The Lost Painting: The Quest for a Caravaggio Masterpiece is a non-fiction book by the author of A Civil Action, Jonathan Harr.  The book traces the recent discovery of a Caravaggio painting, by comparing two copies of the painting and trying to figure out which one is the original The Taking of Christ (c. 1602).  The book is an extension of an article that first appeared in The New York Times. One of the people whose life is recounted in the book is the Oxford philosopher and ontologist of the infosphere Luciano Floridi.

Variety reports that Miramax might produce a film version of the book.

References

Caravaggio
Case studies
Art history books
2005 non-fiction books